Screamin' Swing is a pneumatically powered pendulum ride designed and manufactured by S&S - Sansei Technologies. The ride was first installed and operated in 2004 at Knott's Berry Farm in Buena Park, California, United States.  On February 26, 2022, the tallest and fastest screaming swing in the world opened to SeaWorld San Antonio pass holders and to the public on March 5, 2022.

Design and operation
The original Screamin' Swing consists of a  A-frame, supporting two arms. Each arm supports two rows of seating, back to back. The first Screamin' Swings developed had four seats per arm with two arms. The lowest variant is the four-seat/one-arm design, and the capacities increase to 8 seat, 16 seat, 32 seat and 40 seat designs, all utilizing two arms. For two-arm models, the swings can operate individually or simultaneously (although in opposite directions) and are propelled by compressed air, provided by Ingersoll Rand or Sullair compressors. These compressors disperse air into tanks located within the arms, the movement triggering actuators and cables to produce the motion. Some parks operate Screamin' Swing as an upcharge attraction.

The first larger Screamin' Swing developed was Rush, located at Thorpe Park (UK). It opened in May 2005 as 'The World's Biggest Full Throttle Speed Swing'.

It opened in May 2010, and is billed 'The Giant Canyon Swing'.

Installations

References

External links
Official website

Pendulum rides
Knott's Berry Farm
S&S – Sansei Technologies